The N29 road (Belview Port Road) is a national primary road in  Ireland. It connects the Port of Waterford at Belview, County Kilkenny to Waterford City via the N25. The road and port are located on the north bank of the River Suir.

The N25 (the Ross Road) leads west to Waterford and east to Rosslare Europort.

See also
Roads in Ireland 
Motorways in Ireland
National secondary road
Regional road

References
Roads Act 1993 (Classification of National Roads) Order 2006 – Department of Transport

29
Roads in County Kilkenny
Roads in County Waterford